Fereshteh Sadre Orafaiy (born 29 December 1962) is an Iranian actress. She is best known internationally for her role as Pari in The Circle (2000), which has won several awards including the Golden Lion at the 57th Venice International Film Festival, but is banned in Iran. Sadre Orafaiy has won Best Actress at the 23rd Fajr Film Festival for her acting in Café Transit (2005) and Best Supporting Actress at the 37th Fajr Film Festival for her performance in When the Moon Was Full (2019).

Filmography

Film

Television

External links
 
 Info in French

1962 births
Living people
People from Tehran
Iranian puppeteers
Actresses from Tehran
Iranian film actresses
Iranian television actresses
21st-century Iranian actresses
Crystal Simorgh for Best Actress winners
Crystal Simorgh for Best Supporting Actress winners